Bluff is a ghost town in central Fayette County, Texas, United States.

External links
 

Unincorporated communities in Fayette County, Texas
Unincorporated communities in Texas